This is a list of Los Angeles Historic-Cultural Monuments in Hollywood, Los Angeles, California, United States.  The list includes Hollywood, as well as Griffith Park and the communities of Los Feliz and Little Armenia.  There are more than 148 Historic-Cultural Monuments (HCM) in this area. They are designated by the city's Cultural Heritage Commission.

Historic-Cultural Monuments

Non-HCM historic sites recognized by state and/or nation

See also

Lists of L.A. Historic-Cultural Monuments
 Historic-Cultural Monuments in Downtown Los Angeles
 Historic-Cultural Monuments on the East and Northeast Sides
 Historic-Cultural Monuments in the Harbor area

 Historic-Cultural Monuments in the San Fernando Valley
 Historic-Cultural Monuments in Silver Lake, Angelino Heights, and Echo Park
 Historic-Cultural Monuments in South Los Angeles
 Historic-Cultural Monuments on the Westside
 Historic-Cultural Monuments in the Wilshire and Westlake areas

References

External links
 official Designated L.A. Historic-Cultural Monuments (LAHCM) website — with 'ever-updated' LAHCM list via PDF link.
 LAHCM Report for Hollywood — L.A. Planning Department.
 City of Los Angeles Map — via Given Place Media.
 Big Orange Landmarks:  "Exploring the Landmarks of Los Angeles, One Monument at a Time" — online photos and in-depth history of L.A.H.C.Monuments in Hollywood — website curator: Floyd B. Bariscale.

History of Hollywood, Los Angeles
Buildings and structures in Hollywood, Los Angeles
 
Los Angeles-related lists